Ezhara Ponnana is a 1992 Indian Malayalam film, directed by Thulasidas and produced by Joy Thomas. The film stars Jayaram, Siddique, Kanaka, Thilakan and Anju in lead roles. The film had musical score by Johnson.

Plot
Madhava Menon's son Balan has been missing for the past 18 years. He is believed to be dead by the villagers and relatives. Though Menon and his future daughter-in-law per customs does not believe so. Meanwhile, Vikraman, a Mumbai based smuggler comes to the village and takes up the role of Balan. Everyone in the family is happy. But problems ensue when the real Balan returns and gang members of Vikraman's comes to get him back.

Cast

Jayaram as Balan / Vikraman 
Siddique as Dasan 
Kanaka as Ashwathi 
Thilakan as Madhava Menon 
Anju as Renu 
K. P. A. C. Lalitha as Leelavathi 
Sai Kumar as Balan 
Jagathy Sreekumar as Achu 
Riza Bava as Ramu 
Babu Antony as Charlie 
Krishnan Kutty Nair as Panikkar 
Mamukkoya as Aimutty Koya 
A. C. Zainuddin 
Bobby Kottarakkara 
Mala Aravindan as Anthappan

Soundtrack
"Manimegham" - K. S. Chithra
"Pranaya Manthra" - K J Yesudas, K. S. Chithra
"Unni Pirannal" - K J Yesudas, Sujatha Mohan

References

External links
  
 

1992 films
1990s Malayalam-language films
Films directed by Thulasidas
Films scored by Johnson